Labeobarbus micronema is a species of cyprinid fish native to Cameroon and Gabon in Africa.  It is found in the Sanaga, Nyong, Kribi and Ivindo rivers.

References 

Cyprinid fish of Africa
Taxa named by George Albert Boulenger
Fish described in 1904
micronema